Alberto Gasparini (born January 13, 1940, in Modena, Italy) is an Italian sociologist and professor of urban and rural sociology, of sociology of international relations and of techniques of forecasting. His research and theoretical studies concern the city and the housing, the symbolism of spaces, the cross-border co-operation, the civil societies and the international relations, the futures studies. He is founder and president of the International University Institute of the European Studies (IUIES), co-founder and secretary general of International Futures Research Academy (IFRA). Besides he is founder and director of the following journal: FUTURIBILI (New Edition), ISIG Journal, IUIES Journal.

Biography and career 
The prologue of the academic training of Alberto Gasparini was a research and the subsequent book on the history of international relations, in this case the dispute between the Church and the Dukes of Ferrara between October 1597 and January 1598.

Alberto Gasparini graduated in Sociology from University of Trento (Italy) in 1969. He started working as junior and then senior researcher at the International Sociology Institute of Gorizia (ISIG) from 1970. He was lecturer and then associate professor in sociology of organizations at the University of Bologna from 1977 to 1987. In the 1983 was visiting scholar at University of Washington of Seattle. In the 1987 he became full professor of urban and rural sociology at the University of Trieste. In this University he taught also sociology of international relations and techniques of forecasting.

In 1989 he was appointed director of ISIG, and then director of the Department of Human Sciences at the University of Trieste. In 1992 he started up a research doctorate (PhD) in Sociology of territorial and international phenomena, of which was coordinator.
Alberto Gasparini, as director of ISIG, worked intensively on relations with scholar from, and on the problems of, the countries which emerged from the collapse of the communist system after 1989. In this regard I intensified relations with the Universities of Ljubljana, Zagreb and Belgrade, but above all have developed links with institutional counterparts in the Soviet Union (as was) and subsequently Russia and the Ukraine.

Relations were thereby established with Soviet Institute of Sociology and Academy of Science, the Universities of Moscow, Leningrad (subsequently St. Petersburg), Kharkov and Tyumen. The fruit of these relations included books (such as Social actors and designing the civil society of Eastern Europe) and articles (for Futuribili and Russian journals), conferences and seminars. They also produced a macro-research project on relations among ethnic groups in Europe, including three (Italians, Friulani and Slovenes) in Friuli Venezia Giulia, three (Serbs, Hungarians and Slovaks) in the Yugoslav region of Vojvodina, four (Ukrainians, Russians, Jews and Belorussians) in the region of Kharkov, and four (Russians, Ukrainians, Caucasians and Tartars) in the Siberian region of Tyumen. In 1992 an international conference in Gorizia was attended by many scholars and teachers from universities in eastern Europe, notably Eotvos Lorand University and the University of Economic Sciences in Budapest, the Universities of Warsaw and Kraków and Charles University in Prague. This was the year after the foundation of Isig Journal, which publishes articles in Italian and English on international relations, with particular reference to former communist countries and their transition processes.

International relations is also the theme of an annual workshop The first was organised in 1992 on the Problems of the New Europe, held in an international Summer School.

Held entirely in English, the Summer School has been a focal point for graduates, teachers and experts from all over the world. Every year it deals with fresh social, political and academic themes including Mediterranean relations, cross-border cooperation, the transition of former communist societies, innovation and creativeness, and the construction of international towns and cities.

Working in University and ISIG also gave him the opportunity to resume publication of the prediction journal Futuribili. Running parallel to the English-language Futures and the French Futuribles, it was founded in 1967 by Pietro Ferraro and continued until his death in 1974. Twenty years later I restarted the journal under the ownership of ISIG and with the Angeli publishing house in Milan. Issued in Italian every four months, it deals with the prediction of social and political developments that have included the Yugoslav wars, Russia, the lives of futurologists, the concepts underpinning prediction, the future of religion and the Italy of the future.

Already enhanced in the Italian context by Futuribili, prediction was further expanded by ISIG with the foundation of IFRA, the International Futures Studies Academy. The idea was developed by Igor Besthuzev-Lada (who was elected its president) and Alberto Gasparini (elected secretary-general). Based in Gorizia, IFRA has been joined by leading figures in prediction institutions from all over the world. Its function is to promote the organisation of comparative research and international meetings through telematic conferences. It has so far organised predictive research on Italy and Russia and six seminars on the state of prediction and its methods. 
Meanwhile, in 2000 Alberto Gasparini proposed to nine European universities (Trieste, Udine, Nova Gorica, Klagenfurt, Comenius in Bratislava, Eotvos Lorand in Budapest, Babes-Bolyai in Cluj Napoca, Jagellonica in Kraków and the MGIMO in Moscow) and ISIG the idea of forming an international university consortium of European studies (IUIES) to design and organise a research doctorate (PhD) in “Transborder policies for daily life” and two Masters (MA) courses, one on “Communication and methods of European policy making” and the other on “International Peace Operators”. The PhD lasts three years and the MA courses run for two. The students and teachers in them come from all over the world and carry out all academic activities in English. The PhD and MA qualifications are automatically recognised by all the universities in the consortium, though the degrees are actually awarded by the University of Trieste. The consortium is still operating, and Alberto Gasparini was elected its president.

The experiences described above are only the most salient features of academic career of Alberto Gasparini, which has been given great impetus by his roles as director of the Department of Human Sciences at the University of Trieste, director of ISIG and president of the IUIES (International University Institute for European Studies) consortium. These roles have obviously led him to intense involvement in other work, as editor-in-chief of Isig Journal, Futuribili and Iuies Journal and on the editorial boards of other Italian and foreign journals. He has also been a member of other bodies of the University of Trieste, including the Senate. From 2007 Alberto Gasparini has been appointed a full member of the Club of Rome.

Research and theory, and some publications 
The counterpoint to this work of the academic career has been the publications deriving from the research carried out and the theoretical contributions made to the subjects studied.
Alberto Gasparini has written, co-authored or edited 87 books. A selection is listed below, according to the main themes.

As mentioned earlier, it all began with research in the history of international relations (Cesare d’Este e Clemente VIII, Modena, Stem 1960).

This was followed by a long period devoted to the study of housing and the community: 
- "Per ben abitare", Gorizia, ISIG 2001; 
- "La casa ideale", Venice, Marsilio, 1975; 
- “Influence of the dwelling on family life”, Ekistics, 216, 1973;
- “Community and territorial belonging”, Comparative Sociology, 4, 2010; 
- “The symbolics of the environment as related to attachment to place and community integration”, Indian Journal of Social Research, 4, 1989.

Another constant theme in the research of Alberto Gasparini has been the city in relation to the symbolism of its spaces, organisations, social planning, technology and the future:
- La sociologia degli spazi, Rome, Carocci 2000; 
- “Sistemi urbani e futuro” (ed.), Futuribili, 1–2, 2004; 
- Riqualificazione e hinterland delle grandi città, Milan, Angeli 1993; 
- Innovazione tecnologica e nuovo ordine urbano, Milan, Angeli 1991; 
- Il futuro della città, Milan, Angeli, 1988; 
- Crisi della città e sua reimmaginazione, Milan, Angeli 1982; 
- “The historic center as an integration value for he outlying areas, Italy”, Ekistics, 295, 1982).

In terms of rural modernisation he has published:
- "Ambiente operativo e azienda agricola", Milan, Angeli 1983;
- "Contadino, una scelta", Turin, Paravia 1978.

The research on housing, the community, the city, modernisation, international relations and borders has all been imbued with prediction and the role of new technologies, but to the works already mentioned we can add:
- “La previsione. Modi e temi italiani”, Futuribili, 3, 2005; 
- Prediction and future studies, Encyclopedia of Sociology, New York, McMillan, 2000; 
- The future of the moment before. Scenarios for Russian society, torn between political, and institutional discontinuities and social continuities, Gorizia, ISIG, 1993; 
- “Gerusalemme e il suo futuro, con un prologo a Roma e a Gorizia”, (ed.), Futuribili, 3, 2011).

Themes such as civil society, ethnicity, peace and borders come under the umbrella of international relations, and in this regard we should mention:
- Società civile e relazioni internazionali, Bologna, Il Mulino, 2011; 
- Cross-border co-operation in Europe: A comprehensive overview, Strasburg, Council of Europe, 2012; 
- “Globalisation, reconciliation and the conserving peace”, Global Society, 1, 2008;  
- Cross-border cooperation in the Balkan-Danube area. An analysis of strengths, weaknesses, opportunity and threats, Strasbourg, Council of Europe, 2004; 
- “Mobile borders between the Mediterranean and the continents around it”, ISIG Journal, 3–4, 2009; 
- “Significati d’Europa”, in The Europeans and the contribution are in place - when will Europe be?, Gorizia, ISIG, 2004; 
- Nation, ethnicity, minority and border. Contributions to an international sociology (ed.), Gorizia, ISIG, 1998; 
- Migrations between center and periphery (ed.), Iis, Annals, VI, 1997; 
- “Etnia? Sia se volete che sia” (ed.), Futuribili, 1–2, 1997; 
- Dialogue between cultures and changes in Europe and the world, IIS, Annals, V, 1996; 
- Social actors and designing the civil society of Eastern Europe (ed. with V. Yadov), Greenwich, Conn., Jai Press 1995; 
- “Oltre le guerre balcaniche. Cosa può succedere quando i piccoli dei hanno grandi sogni” (ed. with M. Radojkovic), Futuribili, 2, 1994.

Honors and awards 
Alberto Gasparini has received the following international honors and awards:
-       2013: Jubilee Medal "150th years of the Birth Anniversary of V.I. Vernadsky", Moscow; 
-       2013: Doctor Honoris Causa in International Relations, by the Babes-Bolyai University of Cluj Napoca;
-	2012: Doctor and Professor Honoris Causa in Social Sciences, by the Eötvös Loránd University of Budapest;
-	2007: Expert in the field of trans-border co.operation of Council of Europe;
-	2006: Special expert of the Committee of the Regions of the European Union;
-	1999: Honorary member (no. 4) of the Futures Study Academy, Moscow.

Italian sociologists
Living people
1940 births
Writers from Modena
University of Trento alumni